Jefferson Township is located in Stephenson County, Illinois. As of the 2010 census, its population was 268 and it contained 117 housing units.

Geography
Jefferson is Township 26 North, Range 5 (part) East of the Fourth Principal Meridian.

Demographics

References

External links
City-data.com
Stephenson County Official Site

Townships in Stephenson County, Illinois
Townships in Illinois